F & M (an abbreviation of Frau und Mann; German for "Woman and Man") is the second studio album by German-Swedish super-duo Lindemann. It was released on 22 November 2019 through Universal Music and Vertigo Berlin. The album was preceded by three singles; "Steh auf", "Ich weiß es nicht" and "Knebel", with "Steh auf" peaking at No. 8 in Germany. Vocalist Till Lindemann reverts to singing in German on this album unlike the debut album, Skills in Pills, which he sang entirely in English.

Promotion and release

In 2018, the duo made music for an adaptation of the play "Hänsel und Gretel" with Till Lindemann also appearing in the play. Most songs performed from the play are confirmed to be on the album, with the exception of "Sauber". It is currently unclear whether it will appear as a B-side in the future. "Ich liebe das Leben" is included on the album under the new title of "Wer weiß das schon".

Prior to the announcement of the album, Lindemann released the song "Mathematik", featuring German rapper Haftbefehl, on 18 December 2018, with an accompanying music video. The album was announced on 13 September 2019 alongside the release of the song "Steh auf". A music video for the song, starring the band alongside Swedish actor Peter Stormare, was released on the same day. On 13 October, the band shared a 40-second snippet of the song "Blut" on their YouTube channel. On 18 October, the band shared a third song, "Ich weiß es nicht", along with a remix of the song by American industrial metal band Ministry. On 21 October, they shared a music video for "Ich weiß es nicht", featuring black-and-white computer-generated imagery crafted by artificial intelligence. On 29 October, the band shared a 40-second snippet of the song "Allesfresser" on their YouTube channel. On 1 November, the song "Knebel" was released, along with an accompanying, uncensored music video on www.knebel-video.com.

F & M was released through Universal Music and Vertigo Berlin on 22 November 2019 as a download, 12-inch vinyl, and CD, the latter in standard and deluxe editions. The vinyl release features a different cover art from the other editions of the album. The deluxe CD release is designed as a 42-page hardcover book. The vinyl, deluxe CD, and deluxe digital versions of the album all feature two bonus tracks; the original version of "Mathematik" and a Pain version of "Ach so gern".

Music videos for "Steh auf" and "Frau & Mann" were released, featuring Peter Stormare. Alec Chillingworth from Stereoboard compared three first tracks to Basshunter music sponsored by Classic FM.

Track listing

Personnel
Till Lindemann - vocals, arrangements
Peter Tägtgren - all instruments (except tracks 7, 13 and drums), arrangements, producing, engineering, recording, mixing

Additional personnel
Jonas Kjellgren - all instruments (tracks 7, 13), drums
Matt Heafy - acoustic guitar and production on "Steh auf (Trivium remix)"
Clemens Wijers - orchestra additional arrangements
Svante Forsbäck - mastering
Rocket & Wink - artwork
Heilemania - photography
Jens Koch - photography
Matthias Matthies - photography
Boris Schade - legal consultant 
Lichte Rechtsanwälte - legal consultant
Birgit Fordyce - management
Stefan Mehnert - management

Charts

Weekly charts

Year-end charts

Certifications

Release history

References

Lindemann (band) albums
Albums produced by Peter Tägtgren
Vertigo Records albums
Universal Records albums